Walnut Park Plaza Hotel is a historic apartment hotel located in the Cobbs Creek neighborhood of Philadelphia, Pennsylvania. It was built in 1928, and is a nine-story, red brick building in the Classical Revival-style. The tower takes an "E" shape above the second story. The building was remodeled in 1955. The building has 224 residential units, ranging in size from 539 to 836 square feet (50 – 78 m²).  Also on the property are two outbuildings that once provided access to underground storage.  It has operated as a residence for senior citizens since 1963.

It was added to the National Register of Historic Places in 2005.

References

Residential buildings on the National Register of Historic Places in Philadelphia
Neoclassical architecture in Pennsylvania
Residential buildings completed in 1928
West Philadelphia